Grant Young (born 3 March 1971 in Cape Town) is a football (soccer) player who represented South Africa at international level and participated in two FIFA Club World Cups.

Career
Born in South Africa, Young spent much of his career with local club Hellenic before a stint with Ghent in Belgium. He emigrated to New Zealand in 2004 where he played first for East Coast Bays, before joining Central United and subsequently Auckland City FC.

He represented Auckland City in their first FIFA Club World Cup appearance in 2006, in which they failed to impress, losing every game, and failing to score a single goal, and again in the 2009 competition in United Arab Emirates where they fared better, beating TP Mazembe 3-2 before going out to Atlante Fútbol Club in the quarter finals.

International career
Young made a solitary appearance for South Africa as a substitute in a friendly against Australia on 12 June 1994. Australia won the match 1-0.

References 

1971 births
Living people
Sportspeople from Cape Town
South African soccer players
South African expatriate soccer players
South Africa international soccer players
Expatriate association footballers in New Zealand
White South African people
Hellenic F.C. players
K.A.A. Gent players
East Coast Bays AFC players
Central United F.C. players
Auckland City FC players
Association football forwards
New Zealand Football Championship players